David Leaning (18 August 1936 – 28 July 2015) was an eminent Anglican priest.

Leaning was educated at Keble College, Oxford and ordained in 1961. He was a curate in Gainsborough then held incumbencies in Warsop and Kington before becoming the Archdeacon of Newark. In 1991 he became Provost of Southwell and, when the title changed on 19 March 2000, Dean of Southwell.

In retirement he was chaplain to the parish of St. Mary Magdalene, Bailgate, Lincoln, before moving to Chichester in his last years.

Notes

 

1936 births
2015 deaths
Archdeacons of Newark
Alumni of Keble College, Oxford
Provosts and Deans of Southwell